Shui Xian (traditional/simplified Chinese: 水仙, pinyin:  shuǐxiān) is a cultivar of Camellia sinensis as well as an oolong tea traditionally from the Wuyi Mountains in Fujian, China. The infused color is a deep amber which is characteristic for many other Wuyi oolong teas. This tea is also grown in Taiwan.

Varieties
 Lao Cong Shui Xian: A Shui Xian made from old bushes that may be as old as 200 years. The taste and appearance will signify it as an even darker Oolong.
 Aged Shui Xian: A Shui Xian that may have been aged for a few decades and rebaked.
 Zhangping Shui Xian: A Shui Xian bush that is grown in Zhangping, Longyan, Fujian province and is typically processed as a green oolong.

See also
 Wuyi tea

References  

Wuyi tea
Oolong tea
Chinese teas
Chinese tea grown in Fujian
Cultivars of tea grown in China